Clifton Township is a township in Wilson County, Kansas, in the United States.

History
Clifton Township was named after Clifton, Bristol, England.

References

Townships in Wilson County, Kansas
Townships in Kansas